The 2001 Elite League speedway season  was the 67th season of top division of speedway in the United Kingdom and in 2001 was governed by the Speedway Control Board (SCB), in conjunction with the British Speedway Promoters' Association (BSPA).

Season summary
In 2001, the league consisted of nine teams and operated on a standard format without play-offs. Oxford Cheetahs won their first title since 1989. Leigh Adams was brought in from King's Lynn to lead the team that retained fellow Australian riders Todd Wiltshire and Steve Johnston, Czech brothers Lukáš Dryml and Aleš Dryml Jr. and Dane Brian Andersen. In a closely fought three way title battle they claimed the crown ahead of Poole and Coventry. Poole were led by three times World Champion Tony Rickardsson who would claim his fourth Speedway World Championship during the season. Jason Crump was runner-up in the World Championship and topped the league averages for King's Lynn.

Final table

Peterborough v Belle Vue and Belle Vue v Peterborough not held.

Elite League Knockout Cup
The 2001 Elite League Knockout Cup was the 63rd edition of the Knockout Cup for tier one teams. Peterborough Panthers were the winners of the competition.

First round

Second round

Semi-finals

Final

First leg

Second leg

Peterborough Panthers were declared Knockout Cup Champions, winning on aggregate 93-87.

Leading final averages

Riders & final averages
Belle Vue

 8.00
 7.78
 6.74
 6.33
 6.14
 5.81
 4.74
 4.21
 4.13
 4.00
 3.79
 3.65

Coventry

 9.26 
 9.05 
 7.90
 7.44
 5.39
 5.17
 2.88

Eastbourne

 8.16
 7.60
 6.80
 6.70
 6.46
 6.07
 6.00
 5.42
 5.39 
 5.06

Ipswich

 10.11
 8.06
 7.79 
 7.35 
 6.35
 2.66
 2.08

King's Lynn

 10.39 
 9.01 
 8.75 
 6.76
 6.64
 5.20
 4.71
 4.00
 2.08
 1.83

Oxford

 10.08 
 7.16
 6.99
 6.75
 6.47
 6.12
 2.73

Peterborough

 9.52
 8.37
 7.31
 6.59
 6.18
 5.86
 5.66
 5.23
 0.38

Poole

 9.66 
 8.34 
 8.16 
 6.73
 6.53
 6.51
 5.86
 4.87

Wolverhampton

 9.00
 7.34
 7.33
 5.71
 5.62
 4.70
 2.76
 1.69

See also
 Speedway in the United Kingdom
 List of United Kingdom Speedway League Champions
 Knockout Cup (speedway)

References

SGB Premiership
2001 in British motorsport